Madina is one of the constituencies represented in the Parliament of Ghana. It elects one Member of Parliament (MP) by the first past the post system of election. Madina is located in the Accra Metropolitan Area of the Greater Accra Region of Ghana.

Members of Parliament

References

Parliamentary constituencies in the Greater Accra Region